Capital punishment was abolished in Gabon in 2010. It last executed in 1985. Gabon was classified as "Abolitionist in Practice" prior to abolition in law.

Gabon acceded to the Second Optional Protocol to the International Covenant on Civil and Political Rights on 2 April 2014.

References 

Gabon
Law of Gabon